Boo Gillette De Oliveira is an American, former collegiate softball catcher and current softball head coach originally from Fort Lauderdale, Florida. She is head for the Purdue Boilermakers softball team. Oliveira played college softball at Wisconsin from 2002 to 2005 and was a two-time All-Big Ten Conference honored player. She was the head coach at Madison Area Technical College in 2007.

Coaching career

Arkansas
On July 2, 2015, Arkansas announced that Oliveira would be added to the Arkansas softball staff as an assistant.

Purdue
On August 4, 2016, Boo De Oliveira was named the head coach of the Purdue Boilermakers softball program.

Statistics

Head coaching record

College

References

Living people
Softball players from Florida
Female sports coaches
American softball coaches
Wisconsin Badgers softball players
Purdue Boilermakers softball coaches
North Carolina Tar Heels softball coaches
Arizona State Sun Devils softball coaches
Arkansas Razorbacks softball coaches
Year of birth missing (living people)